Amadeo García de Salazar y Luco (31 March 1887 – 18 June 1947) was a Spanish football manager. He was the manager of the Spain national football team from 1934 to 1936, and coached the team during the 1934 FIFA World Cup.

References

External links
 Fútbol en la Red at Futbol.sportec.es
 Garcia Salazar at Weltfussball.de 

1887 births
1934 FIFA World Cup managers
1947 deaths
Basque Nationalist Action politicians
Basque nationalists
Deportivo Alavés managers
La Liga managers
People from Vitoria-Gasteiz
Spain national football team managers
Spanish dermatologists
Spanish football managers